Dancewicz is a Polish surname. Notable people with the name include:

  (1938-2016), Polish politician 
 Frank Dancewicz (1924–1985), American football quarterback
 Renata Dancewicz (born 1969), Polish actress

Polish-language surnames